Lalthathanga Khawlhring (born 30 March 1998), commonly known as Puitea, is an Indian professional footballer who plays as a central midfielder for Indian Super League club ATK Mohun Bagan FC.

Club career

Bethlehem Vengthlang
Born in Mizoram, Lalthathanga began his career with Bethlehem Vengthlang in the Mizoram Premier League before joining DSK Shivajians's academy. After the 2015–16 season, Lalthathanga was named as the best midfielder in the league.

DSK Shivajians
On 8 January 2017 Lalthathanga made his professional debut for DSK Shivajians in their opening I-League fixture of the 2016–17 season against Mumbai. He started and played the full match despite DSK Shivajians falling 1–0 at the Cooperage Ground.

North East United

Loan to Aizawl
On 29 July 2017,   NorthEast United announced that they had completed a transfer for Lalthathanga, who signed a three-year contract but was immediately loaned to Aizawl for the 2017–18 season. He was a mainstay for Aizawl during the season, and would finish the season with a solitary goal.

Return to North East United

After successful season with Aizawl, Lalthathanga came back to NorthEast United for season 2018–19 season. On 1 October 2018, he made his debut against Goa. He played one more season there and made a total of 29 appearances for the club.

Kerala Blasters

On 16 September, he was signed by Kerala Blasters FC on a three-year deal. He made his debut for the Blasters against ATK Mohun Bagan on 20 November 2020, coming as a substitute in the 47th minute, where the match ended 1–0 in favour of ATK Mohun Bagan. He scored his first-ever goal in Indian Super League and for the club against Bengaluru FC on 20 January 2021, coming on as a 46th minute substitute for Jordan Murray and the match ended 2–1 in favour for Kerala Blasters.

Puitea was included in the Kerala Blasters squad for the 2021 Durand Cup, and played all three matches for the club in the tournament. He played his first match of the 2021–22 Indian Super League season on 25 November 2021, which ended in a 0–0 draw as a substitute for Ayush Adhikari in the 60th minute of the game. Puitea played a fundamental role in Kerala Blasters 3–1 victory over Mumbai City FC on 2 March 2022, and was chosen as the man of the match in the post-match conference. He formed a solid partnership with Jeakson Singh in the midfield and helped the Blasters to reach the finals, which they lost to Hyderabad on penalties.

ATK Mohun Bagan
On 29 December 2022, Puitea was announced to have agreed to join ATK Mohun Bagan for an undisclosed fee subject to the player completing a medical.

Career statistics

Honours

Club

Kerala Blasters FC 

 Indian Super League runner up: 2021–22.

Individual
Mizoram Premier League Best Midfielder 2015–16

References

External links 
 DSK Shivajians Football Club Profile
 

1998 births
Living people
People from Mizoram
Indian footballers
DSK Shivajians FC players
NorthEast United FC players
Aizawl FC players
Association football midfielders
Footballers from Mizoram
Mizoram Premier League players
I-League players
Kerala Blasters FC players
Indian Super League players